Vernal Leroy "Nippy" Jones (June 29, 1925 – October 3, 1995) was an American professional baseball first baseman.

St. Louis Cardinals
After batting .304 for the Cardinals' Pacific Coast League affiliate Sacramento Solons in 1943, Jones left baseball for two years in order to serve in the United States Marine Corps during World War II.

However, he did appear in sixteen games with the Cardinals, and was on their post-season roster. He struck out in his only plate appearance of the 1946 World Series against the Boston Red Sox in game five.

Having originally come up with the Cardinals as a second baseman, he played first base for the 1948 Cardinals, with future Hall of Famer Stan Musial shifting to the outfield. He batted .254 with ten home runs and 81 runs batted in in his first full season for the second place Cardinals.

Sacramento Solons
Jones remained with the Cardinals through . Following the season, he was selected by the Philadelphia Phillies in the rule 5 draft.

He remained with the club through the beginning of the  season. The Milwaukee Braves were in second place behind the Cardinals, and purchased Jones' contract when slugging first baseman Joe Adcock went down with an injury.

1957 World Series and controversy
The highlight of his season occurred on July 26, when he hit a walk off home run in the eleventh inning to lift the Braves to a 6–3 victory over the New York Giants. After finishing second to the Brooklyn Dodgers two years in a row, the Braves won the National League in 1957, and faced the New York Yankees in the World Series.

Jones is remembered for being involved in a controversial "shoe polish incident" in the 1957 Fall Classic. He pinch hit in Games 1 and 3, grounding out both times. Both of those games were won by the Yankees. Game 4 went into extra innings, and when the Yankees took a 5–4 lead in the tenth, the Braves were looking at the possibility of falling three games to one in the series.

Jones led off the Milwaukee half of the tenth inning, pinch hitting for Warren Spahn. He jumped back from a low pitch that home plate umpire Augie Donatelli called a ball. Jones protested that it had hit his foot, and he was awarded first base after showing Donatelli a shoe polish mark on the ball to prove it. Yankees manager Casey Stengel vehemently protested the call, but to no avail. The Braves scored three runs in the tenth, including a two-run home run by Eddie Mathews to end the game and even the series at two games apiece. The play was the turning point in the series, as the Braves went on to win the series in seven games.

A similar incident would be repeated twelve years later by Cleon Jones of the New York Mets in Game 5 of the 1969 World Series.

Personal
After the 1957 World Series, Jones returned to the Sacramento Solons, and remained with them until .

Following his retirement from baseball, Jones worked in public relations and title-insurance businesses in Sacramento, California, and became a professional fishing guide.

Jones died due to a heart attack on October 3, . He was survived by his wife of 49 years, Nora, four children and six grandchildren.

References

External links

1925 births
1995 deaths
United States Marine Corps personnel of World War II
Baltimore Orioles (IL) players
Baseball players from Los Angeles
Baseball players from Sacramento, California
John C. Fremont High School alumni
Major League Baseball controversies
Major League Baseball first basemen
Milwaukee Braves players
Philadelphia Phillies players
Portland Beavers players
Rochester Red Wings players
Sacramento Solons players
St. Louis Cardinals players